Bay Forest is a community located in the southeast corner of Houston, Texas in Houston's Bay Area.  It is part of a family of neighborhoods collectively called Clear Lake City.  It is a bedroom community made up almost entirely of single-family homes, parks, and other open areas.  The community comprises 832 residences and is located on either side of El Dorado Boulevard between Space Center Boulevard and Horsepen Bayou.

The Bay Forest Community Association was officially established with the filing of deed restrictions with Harris County on November 18, 1985.

Parks 
Bay Forest residents enjoy the amenities provided by the following community parks:
Bay Forest Park - a  park offering:
Shaded picnic areas
Open recreation areas
Four controlled access tennis courts with night lighting available
Two "Big Toy" playground areas with a full assortment of children’s activity platforms
Six picnic tables and benches
16 paved parking spaces
Willow Shores Park - a  park offering:
Open sports fields for soccer, football, or any imaginable activity with adjacent shaded areas and benches
A concrete, full-court basketball court with one backboard
Six picnic tables and benches
29 paved parking spaces
Bay Forest Wildlife Preserve - a  habitat of indigenous flora and fauna unique to Gulf Coast riparian reserves that includes a 0.5 mile (800 m) crushed granite trail for exploring or exercising.  Located in the southeast corner of the neighborhood adjacent to Horsepen Bayou, it provides residents with a quiet retreat from city life.  The park is owned by the Houston Parks Board and leased to the community.
Pocket Park - a  shaded, grassy park consisting of two parcels separated by a street.  It includes a concrete walking path and four benches.
Erin Creek Island Park - a shaded,  mini park with five benches for resting or meeting neighbors.

Police/Fire Service 
Houston Police Department's Clear Lake Patrol Division provides police services to the Bay Forest community.  Fire protection and emergency medical services are provided primarily through Fire Station 71 of the Houston Fire Department.

Public Education 
Bay Forest is served by the Clear Creek Independent School District, and local public school students attend Falcon Pass Elementary School, Space Center Intermediate School, and Clear Lake High School.

References

Neighborhoods in Houston
Galveston Bay Area